Roquebillière (historical) is a commune in the Alpes-Maritimes department in southeastern France.

History
It was part of the historic County of Nice until 1860 as ''Roccabigliere."  The town was at one time a Templar settlement.

Population

See also
 Col d'Andrion
Communes of the Alpes-Maritimes department

References

External links
  & (Occitan) Dance and traditional music from Roquebillière

Communes of Alpes-Maritimes
Alpes-Maritimes communes articles needing translation from French Wikipedia